Pontotoc County is the name of two counties in the United States:

 Pontotoc County, Mississippi 
 Pontotoc County, Oklahoma